2010 Abuja attacks may refer to:

October 2010 Abuja bombings
December 2010 Abuja bombing